Malkolm Staffan Moënza (born 15 November 1993) is a Swedish footballer who plays for Jönköpings Södra as a left-back or a left winger.

Career

Club career
In mid-January 2020, Moënza had signed with Slovak leading club, Spartak Trnava.

He had appeared in all four fixtures, since the resuming of the season after the winter break, until the end of the regular part of the season, prior to the outbreak of the COVID-19 pandemic in Slovakia. He had made his debut on 16 February 2020 at Štadión Antona Malatinského in Trnava, during a goal-less tie against reigning champions, table leaders and old-time rivals of Spartak - Slovan Bratislava. He completed the entire fixture.

After a spell at his former club GAIS in 2021, Moënza signed a two-year deal with Jönköpings Södra IF on 20 December 2021.

Personal life
Moënza was born in Majorna in Gothenburg, to a Guadeloupean father and a Swedish mother.

References

External links

1993 births
Living people
Footballers from Gothenburg
Swedish footballers
Swedish people of Guadeloupean descent
Sweden youth international footballers
GAIS players
Dalkurd FF players
Association football defenders
Allsvenskan players
Superettan players
FC Spartak Trnava players
Jönköpings Södra IF players
Slovak Super Liga players
Swedish expatriate footballers
Expatriate footballers in Slovakia
Swedish expatriate sportspeople in Slovakia